Guido Lollobrigida (1927–2013) was an Italian actor and race car driver, usually credited in movies as Lee Barton or Lee Burton. 
He was a cousin of actress Gina Lollobrigida.

Life and career
Born in Rome, after graduating as a technical engineer Lollobrigida moved to South America, where in 1957 he made his acting debut in a film which was never distributed.

Returned to Italy in the mid-1960s, he immediately started a prolific career in genre films, mainly Spaghetti Westerns and adventure films, sometimes cast in leading roles. Starting from the second half of the 1970s, he significantly slowed his activities.

Selected filmography

100.000 dollari per Ringo (1965) - Luke Sherry 
The Spy with Ten Faces (1966) - Santos
Kill Johnny Ringo (1966) - Sheriff Parker / Lee Mellin
Django Shoots First (1966) - Ward
Two Sons of Ringo (1966) - Fred, Saloon Owner
Mexican Slayride (1967) - Montez
The Cobra (1967) - Killer
O.K. Connery (1967) - Kurt
Your Turn to Die (1967)
Man, Pride and Vengeance (1967) - Tanquiero / Lopez - Smuggler's Leader
Vengeance (1968)
Django, Prepare a Coffin (1968) - Jonathan Abbott 
A Long Ride from Hell (1968) - Deputy Sheriff Harry
Giugno '44 - Sbarcheremo in Normandia (1968) - Alan
Bandits in Rome (1968) - Angelo Scotese
Cemetery Without Crosses (1969) - Thomas Caine
Bloody Che Contra (1969) - Vicente
Battle of the Commandos (1969) - Pvt. Tom Carlyle
And God Said to Cain (1970) - Miguel Santamaria
Mafia Connection (1970) - Michele
Roy Colt and Winchester Jack (1970) - Winchester's lead henchman 
Rough Justice (1970) - Bowen - the Saloon Owner
Mio padre monsignore (1971) - Odeschi 
Terrible Day of the Big Gundown (1971) - Sheriff Jed
Drummer of Vengeance (1971) - Steve 
Red Sun (1971) - Mace 
African Story (1971) - Zack 
Brother Sun, Sister Moon (1972)
Crime Boss (1972) - Peppino Lo Surdo
Gang War in Naples (1972) - Mobster (uncredited)
Rugantino (1973)
Those Dirty Dogs (1973) - Corporal
Brothers Blue (1973) - Sheriff 
Number One (1973)
The Pumaman (1980) - Kobras Thug with Moustache
Tom Horn (1980) - Cowboy

References

External links
 

1927 births
Male actors from Rome
Male Spaghetti Western actors
2013 deaths
People of Lazian descent